The 2015 Africa T20 Cup was a Twenty20 cricket tournament held in South Africa from 4 September to 4 October 2015, as a curtain-raiser to the 2015–16 South African domestic season. Organized by Cricket South Africa, it featured thirteen South African provincial teams, as well as a Zimbabwean development XI and the national sides of Kenya and Namibia.

The sixteen participating teams were split into four pools of four, with the teams from each pool playing all of their matches at one ground across a single weekend. Benoni, Potchefstroom, Kimberley, and Bloemfontein hosted matches, as other venues were unavailable at that point in the season. Northerns defeated KwaZulu-Natal Inland in the final, which was held at Bloemfontein's Mangaung Oval. The tournament's leading runscorer was KZN Inland's Vaughn van Jaarsveld, while four players shared the leading wicket taker title.

Pool A

Squads

 Note: Wayne Parnell was originally named in Western Province's squad, but was forced to withdraw due to a hamstring injury. He was replaced by Lizaad Williams.

Points table

Fixtures

Pool B

Squads

Note: Justin Ontong was originally named in Boland's squad, but withdrew to focus on his recovery from knee surgery. His replacement is yet to be named.

Points table

Fixtures

Pool C

Squads

Points table

Fixtures

Pool D

Squads

Points table

Fixtures

Finals

Semi-finals

Final

Statistics

Most runs
The top five runscorers are included in this table, ranked by runs scored, then by batting average, then alphabetically by surname.

Source: ESPNcricinfo

Most wickets

The top five wicket takers are listed in this table, ranked by wickets taken and then by bowling average.

Source: ESPNcricinfo

References

External links
 Series home at ESPNCricinfo

2015
2015 in Kenyan cricket
2015 in Namibian sport
2015 in South African cricket
2015 in Zimbabwean cricket
International cricket competitions in 2015